The Notre Dame Fighting Irish women's soccer team represents the University of Notre Dame in National Collegiate Athletic Association Division I women's soccer. The team competes in the Atlantic Coast Conference and is currently coached by Nate Norman, following the resignation of Theresa Romagnolo. The Fighting Irish have won three of the 29 NCAA national championships.

History
Notre Dame's women's soccer team won the National Championship in 1995, 2004 and 2010 and were the runner-up in 1994, 1996, 1999, 2006, and 2008. Notre Dame also ranks second in all-time title game appearances (8) behind North Carolina (24). Like Notre Dame, the University of Portland is also a private Roman Catholic university affiliated with the Congregation of Holy Cross. Notre Dame's women's soccer program started in 1988 under coach Chris Petrucelli. Their 1995 Big East title was the university's first in any sport. That same year, Petrucelli's squad, under the leadership of Cindy Daws, won the program's first national title, defeating Portland 1–0. Randy Waldrum, took over the program in 1999 and maintained the Fighting Irish's success, winning the national title in 2004 by beating UCLA 4–3 as well as capturing six Big East titles. Waldrum's 2010 squad won the school's third national title, going 21-2-2 and posting 15 shutouts and became the lowest ranked team to do so, beating undefeated Stanford in a 1–0 decision. In doing so, they outscored their postseason opponents 15–1. They also reached the College Cup for the fifth straight year, a school record. Their senior class won 87 matches in their 4 years, the most in that span. Three Notre Dame players have won the Hermann Trophy, given to the United States' best male and female collegiate soccer players. They are Cindy Daws (1996), Anne Makinen (2000) and Kerri Hanks (2006, 2008). Hanks is one of only four players to win the award twice. Notre Dame is also one of only two schools with three or more different Hermann Trophy recipients.

On October 19, 2014, Elizabeth Tucker received the 2014 NCAA Woman of the Year Award.  She became the first Notre Dame student-athlete in any sport to be selected for this prestigious honor in its 24-year history.  She's also the first soccer player ever to win the award from any school. Elizabeth Tucker is also the first student-athlete in Notre Dame history to sweep all four of the university's major athletics honors in the same year.  What's truly amazing is that she did not play high school soccer and yet started in 22 of 25 games during her freshman year in 2010 and helped lead the Fighting Irish to the NCAA Division I Championship in that same year. She was a team captain by her junior year and as a senior, her teammates selected her as their most valuable player.  Her exceptional work ethic and fitness level enabled her to appear in all 92 matches of her college career (starting 87 times). Knowing that she did not play high school soccer, one begins to understand how all this was possible when one discovers that she was a track, cross country and basketball standout at Bishop Kenny High School in Jacksonville, Florida. For starters, this is where she anchored the three-time state championship winning 4 × 800 m relay team from 2007 to 2009, was a member of 2008 state championship cross country team as well as a 2009 first-team all-state cross country selection. Tucker also earned all-city first team honors for basketball in 2009 and served as team captain.

On January 3, 2014, Waldrum resigned after 15 seasons with the Fighting Irish to become the head coach of newly established NWSL team Houston Dash. On March 19, 2014, Theresa Romagnolo was appointed as his successor. Prior to coaching the Fighting Irish, Romagnolo had been the women's soccer head coach at Dartmouth the past three seasons, and had also been an assistant coach at Stanford and at the University of San Diego. Romagnolo resigned on January 22, 2018, citing the desire to spend more time with her family. Assistant coach Nate Norman was promoted to head coach on February 20, 2018.

Personnel

Current roster

Team management

Seasons

^ In 1991, Notre Dame began play in the Horizon League.
† In 1995, Notre Dame began play in the Big East.
‡ In 2013, Notre Dame began play in the Atlantic Coast Conference.

Individual honors

NCAA Woman of the Year Award:
Elizabeth Tucker - 2014

Hermann Trophy:
Cindy Daws - 1996
Anne Makinen - 2000
Kerri Hanks - 2006, 2008

Big East Offensive Player of the Year:
Katie Thorlakson - 2004, 2005
Kerri Hanks - 2006, 2008
Brittany Bock - 2007
Lauren Fowlkes - 2009
Melissa Henderson - 2010

Big East Defensive Player of the Year:
Jen Grubb - 1999
Candace Chapman - 2002, 2005
Melissa Tancredi - 2003, 2004
Carrie Dew - 2008

Big East Midfielder of the Year:
Anne Makinen - 2000
Jen Buczkowski - 2005
Courtney Barg - 2009

Big East Rookie of the Year: 
Jenny Streiffer - 1996 
Vanessa Pruzinsky - 1999
Christie Shaner - 2003
Kerri Hanks - 2005
Melissa Henderson - 2008

Big East All-Rookie Team: 
Elizabeth Tucker - 2010

Big East Championship All-Tournament Team: 
Elizabeth Tucker - 2012

U.S. Under-23 Women's National Team: 
Elizabeth Tucker - 2012

Capital One Academic All-America (CoSIDA) First Team: 
Elizabeth Tucker - 2012–2013, 2013–2014

ACC Scholar-Athlete of the Year: 
Elizabeth Tucker - 2014

Notre Dame Byron V. Kanaley Award: 
Elizabeth Tucker - 2014

Notre Dame Francis Patrick O'Connor Award: 
Elizabeth Tucker - 2014

Notre Dame Athletics Community Champion Award: 
Elizabeth Tucker - 2014

Notre Dame Top Gun Award: 
Elizabeth Tucker - 2014

Notre Dame Monogram Club Team Most Valuable Player Award: 
Elizabeth Tucker - 2014

NCAA Postgraduate Scholarship: 
Elizabeth Tucker - 2014

ACC Postgraduate Scholarship: 
Elizabeth Tucker - 2014

Notable alumni

Current Professionals 
 Kelly Lindsey (1997–2000)  Currently manager of Morocco international
 Adriana Leon (2010–2011) – Currently with Manchester United and Canada international
 Crystal Thomas (2012–2013) – Currently with Hibernian
 Katie Naughton (2012–2015) – Currently with Houston Dash
 Cari Roccaro (2012–2015) – Currently with Angel City
 Mónica Flores (2014–2017) – Currently with Monterrey and Mexico international
 Sabrina Flores (2014–2018) – Currently with NJ/NY Gotham and Mexico international

References

External links
 

 
Soccer clubs in Indiana
NCAA Division I women's soccer teams